Brugué is a Catalan surname. Notable people with the surname include:

Monserrat Brugué (born 1967), Peruvian actress
Roger Brugué (born 1996), Spanish footballer

Catalan-language surnames